Ecorse is a city in Wayne County in the U.S. state of Michigan.  The population was 9,512 at the 2010 census.

Ecorse is part of the Downriver community within Metro Detroit.  The city shares a northwestern border with the city of Detroit and also borders the cities of Lincoln Park to the west, River Rouge to the north, and Wyandotte to the south.  The city shares its name with the Ecorse River, which forms its southern border with Wyandotte.  The Detroit River forms the city's eastern border as part of the Canada–United States border with LaSalle, Ontario.

Etymology
Native American tribes of this area used this area as a burial ground. When French colonists settled here in the last two decades of the 18th century, they named the waterway "Rivière Aux Échorches", which means "The River of the Barks" in English.

History
In 1836, after the community had become part of United States territory, it was settled by more English speakers, who named it Grand Port. The community was unincorporated within Ecorse Township.  In 1903 the settlement was incorporated as the village of Ecorse.  With the opening of its first steel mill in 1923, Michigan Steel Mill, Ecorse began to become an economic force in the region. The village incorporated as a city in 1942.

Since the later 20th century and restructuring of heavy industry, the city, like many industrial inner-ring suburbs, has fallen into economic decline. In December 1986, the Wayne County Circuit Court issued a court order appointing a receiver for the bankrupt city. The receivership would last until August 1990, but the city's finances were monitored by the state of Michigan for another ten years.

By September 2009, with the city facing a $9 million deficit and a federal corruption probe, Governor Jennifer Granholm declared a financial emergency for Ecorse, and appointed an emergency financial manager.  On September 25, 2009, Ecorse Mayor Herbert Worthy and city Controller Erwin Hollenquest were arrested on charges of conspiracy, bribery, and fraud.

On May 1, 2013, the City of Ecorse was moved from under an emergency manager to a state transition advisory board, which includes the previous emergency manager.

Geography

The Detroit River forms the eastern border of the city, and the Ecorse River forms the southern boundary.  Mud Island within the Detroit River is part of Ecorse and is included in the Detroit River International Wildlife Refuge.

Education

Primary and secondary schools
Ecorse Public Schools operates the public schools in the city. These include Ralph J. Bunche School (PreK-3), Grandport Elementary School (4-7), and Ecorse Community High School (8-12). Project Excel is a 3-8 magnet school in Ecorse.

Public libraries
Ecorse Public Library is located in the city. Two Dearborn architects, Bennett and Straight, designed the current library complex, which was built to be fireproof.

The first library services appeared in Ecorse in 1922, when a group of books from the Wayne County Library Service were placed for local use at Loveland's Pharmacy. During the following year, the owner of the pharmacy moved his business to gain a larger space and dedicated a section of the new location to the library. Due to a lack of space for a new book collection, library services were stopped in 1925. Services resumed on March 22, 1926, when the library re-opened in the DeWallot building with 600 volumes of books; for the first time the library had its own quarters. By 1929 the Ecorse library had four staff members. Two operated other library branches in Ecorse: one in the Ecorse Municipal Building and one located on Visger Road.

The current Ecorse Public Library opened on December 12, 1948, with a dedication by Mayor William Vosine. The library's cost was $150,000. The American Library Association selected the library as one of the best small libraries in the United States.

Parks and recreation
Ecorse has a Senior Center and a rowing club. The John D. Dingell Park is located along the Detroit River.

Demographics

2010 census
At the 2010 census there were 9,512 people in 3,646 households, including 2,285 families, in the city. The racial makeup of the city was 44.0% White (36.5% non-Hispanic white), 46.4% African American, 0.8% Native American, 0.3% Asian, 4.0% from other races, and 4.6% from two or more races. Hispanic or Latino of any race were 13.4%.

Of the 3,646 households 34.6% had children under the age of 18 living with them, 24.7% were married couples living together, 29.3% had a female householder with no husband present, 8.7% had a male householder with no wife present, and 37.3% were non-families. 31.3% of households were one person and 11.8% were one person aged 65 or older. The average household size was 2.60 and the average family size was 3.26.

The median age was 35.4 years. 27.1% of residents were under the age of 18; 10.1% were between the ages of 18 and 24; 24.7% were from 25 to 44; 25.3% were from 45 to 64; and 12.8% were 65 or older. The gender makeup of the city was 47.3% male and 52.7% female.

2000 census
At the 2000 census there were 11,229 people in 4,339 households, including 2,733 families, in the city. The racial makeup of the city was 52.18% White, 40.56% African American, 0.65% Native American, 0.19% Asian, 0.02% Pacific Islander, 3.36% from other races, and 3.05% from two or more races. Hispanic or Latino of any race were 8.94%. and 5.8% Irish ancestry according to Census 2000. 92.7% spoke English only, while 6.3% spoke Spanish.

Of the 4,339 households 30.0% had children under the age of 18 living with them, 31.0% were married couples living together, 25.1% had a female householder with no husband present, and 37.0% were non-families. 31.1% of households were one person and 10.7% were one person aged 65 or older.  The average household size was 2.58 and the average family size was 3.23.

The age distribution was 27.8% under the age of 18, 9.8% from 18 to 24, 29.3% from 25 to 44, 20.7% from 45 to 64, and 12.3% 65 or older.  The median age was 33 years. For every 100 females, there were 94.8 males.  For every 100 females age 18 and over, there were 91.3 males.

The median household income was $27,142 and the median family income  was $32,374. Males had a median income of $33,915 versus $22,500 for females. The per capita income for the city was $14,468.  About 17.3% of families and 22.6% of the population were below the poverty line, including 34.2% of those under age 18 and 12.2% of those age 65 or over.

References

External links

 
Cities in Wayne County, Michigan
Metro Detroit
Michigan populated places on the Detroit River
Populated places established in 1903
1903 establishments in Michigan